Sandnes Ulf is a Norwegian association football club from Sandnes, Rogaland, currently playing in the 1. divisjon, the second highest division in the Norwegian football league system. The club play their home matches at Øster Hus Arena. The club was founded on 1 June 1911 as SK Ulf, and today has over 80 registered teams, making it the largest football club in Rogaland.

Sandnes Ulf play in light blue jerseys, white shorts and light blue socks. Sandnes Ulf is an open member association and the annual general meeting is the highest policy-making body. The meeting approves the accounts and elects the chairman and board. Stig Ravndal is the current chairman, elected in 2012. Daily operations are run by a managing director who liaises with the chairman.

Sandnes Ulf's official fan club is known as Gaukereiret ("The Cuckoo's Nest"), reflecting on the nickname for people from Sandnes; Sandnes-cuckoos.

History 
The sport of football came directly to Sandnes from its home country, England, when two British brothers Arnold and Hubert Thomas moved to the town in 1907. It didn't take long before Sandnes' first football club was established, Sandnes Fodboldforening, but the club was dissolved a few years later when the two brothers moved back to England. The interest and love for football, however, had found its place in Sandnes, and in the summer of 1911 the new football club, Sportsklubben Ulf, was founded.

Nils Voss, a 1912 Olympic gold-medal winner in gymnastics, became the club's first President. In its inaugural year the club had a turnover of 88 Norwegian krones and 84 øre (approximately 14 US$). In 1916 the club's board decided to introduce a new uniform, choosing the light blue jersey and white shorts we see today.

In 1919 the club was promoted to class A in Landsdelsserien, which at the time was the highest level. In June 1927 the club opened Sandnes stadion, the arena where the club played until 2020, when they moved about 100 meters to Øster Hus Arena.

The 1930s was a successful decade for the club with top-3 positions six years in a row, and qualifying for the newly established top division Norgesserien in 1937. The club played at this level until 1940 when the season was cancelled due to World War II. When the league started again in 1947 the club failed to qualify.

SK Ulf had spells on the second highest level during the 1950s, 60s and 70s, but have mostly been playing at level three or four in the 80s and 90s.

In 1997 the 11 football clubs of Sandnes founded Sandnes FK in an attempt to form a potential top club. The project however only succeeded partly, with a couple of seasons in Second Division. In 2003 Sandnes FK was on the verge of bankruptcy when they won their Third Division group, whereas Ulf-Sandnes was relegated to Fourth Division. This increased the keenness of both parts to cooperate, and during the winter of 2003/04 Sandnes FK incorporated into Ulf, with Ulf thus changing its name to Sandnes Ulf.

With Asle Andersen arriving at the club in 2006 as a player-manager he revitalised and professionalised the club and immediately brought on-field success. In 2007, Sandnes Ulf won promotion to Adeccoligaen (2008 1. divisjon), the second highest division in the Norwegian football league system. They won their 2. divisjon group three points ahead of Stavanger IF. This sparked renewed interest in the club, with increased press coverage and attendances at Sandnes stadion.

Prior to the 2008 season, the signings of Paul Oyuga and Artur Kotenko brought even more experience from professional football to the club. They were relegated back to 2. divisjon in 2008, but recovered and returned to the 1. divisjon for the 2010 season.

The club finished the 2010 1. divisjon at a relegation spot once again. However, Follo FK, a team which had managed to avoid relegation, was forced to withdraw from the league because of financial difficulties, and Sandnes Ulf kept its place in the division for the 2011 1. divisjon.

The 2011 season turned out to be very successful for the club: On 23 October 2011, one hundred years after its formation and one year after it was supposed to be relegated from the 1. divisjon, Sandnes Ulf gained promotion to the Norwegian top flight. Until that date, Sandnes had been the only city amongst the 10 largest cities in Norway which had not had a team in the top flight after World War Two.

Stadium

Sandnes Ulf are playing their home games at Øster Hus Arena, which is located next to their old stadium. The stadium is an all-seater with a capacity of 6,046 spectators.

Recent history 
("Ulf-Sandnes" until, and including, 2003)
{|class="wikitable"
|-bgcolor="#efefef"
! Season
!
! Pos.
! Pl.
! W
! D
! L
! GS
! GA
! P
!Cup
!Notes
|-
|2001
|2. divisjon
|align=right bgcolor="#FFCCCC"| 12
|align=right|26||align=right|9||align=right|4||align=right|13
|align=right|47||align=right|56||align=right|31
|First round
|Relegated to the 3. divisjon
|-
|2002
|3. divisjon
|align=right |6
|align=right|22||align=right|10||align=right|3||align=right|9
|align=right|42||align=right|40||align=right|33
|
|
|-
|2003
|3. divisjon
|align=right bgcolor=#DDFFDD| 1
|align=right|22||align=right|18||align=right|2||align=right|2
|align=right|61||align=right|25||align=right|56
|First round
|Promoted to the 2. divisjon
|-
|2004
|2. divisjon
|align=right |8
|align=right|26||align=right|10||align=right|4||align=right|12
|align=right|38||align=right|47||align=right|34
|Second round
|
|-
|2005
|2. divisjon
|align=right |4
|align=right|26||align=right|11||align=right|9||align=right|6
|align=right|57||align=right|43||align=right|42
|Second round
|
|-
|2006
|2. divisjon
|align=right |2
|align=right|26||align=right|15||align=right|7||align=right|4
|align=right|50||align=right|32||align=right|52
|First round
|
|-
|2007
|2. divisjon
|align=right bgcolor=#DDFFDD| 1
|align=right|26||align=right|17||align=right|4||align=right|5
|align=right|66||align=right|30||align=right|55
|First round
|Promoted to the 1. divisjon
|-
|2008
|1. divisjon
|align=right bgcolor="#FFCCCC"| 15
|align=right|30||align=right|5||align=right|10||align=right|15
|align=right|36||align=right|55||align=right|25
||Third round
|Relegated to the 2. divisjon
|-
|2009
|2. divisjon
|align=right bgcolor=#DDFFDD| 1
|align=right|26||align=right|19||align=right|4||align=right|3
|align=right|88||align=right|28||align=right|61
||Second round
|Promoted to the 1. divisjon
|-
|2010
|1. divisjon
|align=right |13
|align=right|28||align=right|8||align=right|7||align=right|13
|align=right|33||align=right|40||align=right|31
||Third round
|Escaped relegation due to the demotion of Follo FK for financial reasons
|-
|2011 
|1. divisjon
|align=right bgcolor=#DDFFDD| 2
|align=right|30||align=right|18||align=right|2||align=right|10
|align=right|58||align=right|32||align=right|56
||Third round
|Promoted to the Tippeligaen
|-
|2012 
|Tippeligaen
|align=right |14
|align=right|30||align=right|8||align=right|8||align=right|14
|align=right|44||align=right|56||align=right|32
||First round
|
|-
|2013
|Tippeligaen
|align=right |13
|align=right|30||align=right|9||align=right|6||align=right|15
|align=right|36||align=right|58||align=right|33
||Second round
|
|-
|2014 
|Tippeligaen
|align=right bgcolor="#FFCCCC"| 16
|align=right|30||align=right|4||align=right|10||align=right|16
|align=right|27||align=right|53||align=right|22
||First round
|Relegated to the 1. divisjon
|-
|2015 
|1. divisjon
|align=right |7
|align=right|30||align=right|13||align=right|8||align=right|9
|align=right|49||align=right|40||align=right|47
||Second round
|
|-
|2016 
|1. divisjon
|align=right |4
|align=right|30||align=right|15||align=right|6||align=right|9
|align=right|55||align=right|28||align=right|51
||Fourth round
|
|-
|2017 
|1. divisjon
|align=right |5
|align=right|30||align=right|14||align=right|9||align=right|7
|align=right|44||align=right|39||align=right|51
||Second round
|
|-
|2018 
|1. divisjon
|align=right |10
|align=right|30||align=right|11||align=right|9||align=right|10
|align=right|43||align=right|47||align=right|42
||Third round
|
|-
|2019 
|1. divisjon
|align=right |9
|align=right|30||align=right|11||align=right|5||align=right|14
|align=right|46||align=right|49||align=right|38
||Third round
|
|-
|2020 
|1. divisjon
|align=right |7
|align=right|30||align=right|11||align=right|8||align=right|11
|align=right|46||align=right|55||align=right|41
||Cancelled
|
|-
|2021 
|1. divisjon
|align=right |8
|align=right|30||align=right|10||align=right|9||align=right|11
|align=right|43||align=right|49||align=right|39
||Quarter-final
|
|-
|2022
|1. divisjon
|align=right |5
|align=right|30||align=right|14||align=right|5||align=right|11
|align=right|54||align=right|52||align=right|47
||Third round
|
|-
|}
Source:

Current squad

Managerial history

Notes

Literature
 Frank Bertelsen m. fl. (2011). 100 år med lyseblå kjærlighet; Sandnes Ulf 1911-2011. Dreyer Bok.
 Olav Kåre Nygaard & Lars Strusshamn (2001): Ulf-Sandnes gjennom 15 år, 1986-2001
 Odd Fladen, Petter Tjessheim & Lars Strusshamn (1986): Sportsklubben Ulf gjennom 75 år, 1911-1986

External links 

Gaukereiret supporterklubb – Sandnes Ulf Supporter's Club

 
Football clubs in Norway
Eliteserien clubs
Sport in Sandnes
Association football clubs established in 1911
1911 establishments in Norway